Cottontail is an upcoming drama film written and directed by Patrick Dickinson.

Premise
A widower and his son travel from Japan to England's Lake District to scatter his wife's ashes there, having grown up loving the stories of Beatrix Potter.

Cast
Lily Franky as Kenzaburo
Ryo Nishikido as Toshi
Tae Kimura as Akiko
Rin Takanashi as Satsuki
Ciarán Hinds as John
Aoife Hinds as Mary

Production
It was announced in November 2019 that Ken Watanabe, Ralph Fiennes, Jessie Buckley and Dai Watanabe had been cast in the film. Filming was set take place between Japan and England beginning in the fall of 2020.

In April 2021, the previously announced cast, minus Buckley, had exited the film, with Lily Franky, Ciarán Hinds, Ryo Nishikido, Tae Kimura and Rin Takanashi now set to star. Filming took place in June 2021.

Late 2022, it was announced that Ciarán Hinds's daughter Aoife Hinds had replaced Buckley.

References

External links 
 Cottontail - WestEnd Films
Cottontail at the Internet Movie Database

British drama films
Upcoming English-language films
Films about grieving
Films set in Japan
Japanese-language films
Upcoming films
Films shot in England
Films shot in Japan
Beatrix Potter